Amphilius athiensis is a species of catfish in the genus Amphilius. It lives in the Athi and Galana River system. Its length reaches 16 cm.

References 

athiensis
Freshwater fish of Africa
Fish described in 2010